Martin Heeb (born 5 November 1969) is a retired Liechtenstein football player.

International career
He was a member of the Liechtenstein national football team from 1994 to 2004.

External links

1969 births
Living people
Liechtenstein footballers
Liechtenstein international footballers
Association football goalkeepers
FC Schaan players
FC Vaduz players
USV Eschen/Mauren players